Camberwell is a suburb of Melbourne, Victoria, Australia, 9 km east of Melbourne's Central Business District, located within the City of Boroondara local government area. Camberwell recorded a population of 21,965 at the 2021 census.

The western, southern and eastern boundaries of the suburb generally follow Burke Road, Toorak Road and Warrigal Road respectively. The northern boundary generally follows Riversdale Road, except for an area in the northwest where it extends upwards to Canterbury Road, incorporating Camberwell, East Camberwell and Riversdale railway stations. Known for grand, historic residences and tranquil, leafy streets, Camberwell is commonly regarded as one of Melbourne's most prestigious and exclusive suburbs.

Camberwell is designated one of 26 Principal Activity Centres in the Melbourne 2030 Metropolitan Strategy.

A feature of Camberwell is the Burke Road shopping strip, which stretches north, approximately 600 m from Camberwell Junction, where three tram routes converge—the 70, 72, and 75. Halfway up the shopping strip is Camberwell railway station, which services the Belgrave, Lilydale, and Alamein train lines. East Camberwell, Riversdale, Willison, and Hartwell stations also lie within the suburb's boundaries. Several bus routes also cover the area.

The historic Rivoli Cinemas sit just west of Camberwell Junction, in the adjacent suburb of Hawthorn East.

Camberwell has several parks, reserves and playgrounds, most notably, Frog Hollow Reserve, Fordham Gardens, Cooper Reserve, Bowen Gardens, Lynden Park, Highfield Park, Riversdale Park and Willison Park.

Camberwell is home to a number of notable head offices, including Pacific Brands and Bakers Delight.

History

Camberwell received its name as a result of an early settler being reminded of the way three roads intersected in the south London district of Camberwell. This intersection is now known as Camberwell Junction. The development that followed was a product of the expansion of Melbourne's suburban rail network in the 1880s.

Camberwell Post Office opened on 12 October 1864.

The Prospect Hill Road Precinct area is adjacent to the railway station and is the oldest part of the suburb. The original subdivision was relatively generous blocks, which were quickly filled with fine Victorian and Edwardian houses. Due to its hilly topography, many east–west streets in the Prospect Hill area have an excellent view of Melbourne's Central Business District. Its main commercial centre developed along Burke Road from its railway station to Camberwell Junction, 500 m to the south. Several tram routes converge on this point.

Though the area was originally agricultural, Camberwell is now one of the most well-established of Melbourne's affluent suburbs. It is part of the City of Boroondara, the local government area with the lowest socio-economic disadvantage index in Australia. There is almost no industrial land in Camberwell, and commercial uses are concentrated near the Burke Road precinct, which has long been one of the busiest in suburban Melbourne.

Development controversies
In the 1980s, a planned major development to the east of the Burke Road shopping strip met substantial opposition from local residents. National Mutual Life Association proposed a 24,000 sq.m. three-storey enclosed shopping centre, which drew substantial objection. Developer Floyd Podgornik's Podgor Group (Podgor) purchased the site from National Mutual in 1987 and submitted revised plans to Camberwell Council. When the Council approved Podgor's plans in 1988, 400 residents stormed the meeting. At elections later that year, anti-development protesters won control of the Council and although the developer subsequently proposed a lesser development, in 1990 it rescinded its decision to approve the shopping centre. Subsequently, Podgor sued the council to court and was awarded $25m in damages.

Similar opposition was mounted regarding plans dating from 1999 to develop Camberwell railway station to incorporate retail and office development. High-profile present and past residents Geoffrey Rush and Barry Humphries supported the protest action, but the development was finally approved in 2009. However, the development never eventuated after VicTrack, the owner of the land, announced that it would not proceed with construction.

Neighbourhoods
East Camberwell, Hartwell, Riversdale and Willison are four officially named neighbourhoods, within the general area of the railway stations of the same name.

The southern areas of the Prospect Hill Precinct (from the south side of Prospect Hill Road to Riversdale Road) were developed for the Riversdale Estate, Kasouka Estate and Gladstone Park Estates from the late nineteenth century. The Kasouka Estate was created in 1891 and included Kasouka Road, Trafalgar, Prospect Hill and Riversdale Roads.  Kasouka Road has a high level of visual cohesion and is dominated by Victorian and Edwardian period villas.

Population
According to the 2021 census of Population, there were 21,965 people in Camberwell.
 65.8% of people were born in Australia. The next most common countries of birth were China 7.0%, England 3.3%, India 2.0%, New Zealand 2.0% and Malaysia 1.7%.
 71.1% of people spoke only English at home. Other languages spoken at home included Mandarin 9.3%, Greek 2.4%, Cantonese 2.1%, Italian 1.5% and French 1.3%.
 The most common responses for religion were No Religion 43.8%, Catholic 20.5% and Anglican 8.9%.

Notable residents
 Marie Collier, soprano
 Peter Costello, Former Federal Treasurer and former MP for Higgins
 Sir Rupert Hamer, Victorian Premier 1971–1981
 Alf Howard, scientist and explorer
 Barry Humphries, Australian comedian, best known for his alter ego Dame Edna Everage; Humphries grew up in 36 Christowel Street, in the Golf Links Estate
 Norman Lacy, Victorian Arts and Educational Services Minister 1979–1982
 Nellie Constance Martyn, businesswoman
 Kylie Minogue and Dannii Minogue, Australian singers, were raised in nearby Surrey Hills and attended Camberwell High School.
 Keith Murdoch, newspaper journalist, writer, editor
 Adam Plack, didgeridoo player
 Geoffrey Rush, Australian actor
 Dom Tyson, AFL footballer for the Melbourne Football Club

Transport

Camberwell is well-serviced by public transport, with three rail lines, three tram routes and three bus services operating throughout the suburb.

Bus
285: Doncaster Park & Ride – Camberwell via North Balwyn
612: Box Hill Central Shopping Centre – Chadstone Shopping Centre

Tram
70: Waterfront City Docklands - Wattle Park
72: Melbourne University – Camberwell
75: Docklands Stadium – Vermont South

Train
Camberwell is serviced by Camberwell, East Camberwell, Riversdale, Willison and Hartwell railway stations, located on the following lines:

Alamein
Belgrave
Lilydale

Schools

Camberwell Primary School
Camberwell High School
Siena College
Camberwell Girls Grammar School
St Dominic's Catholic Primary School

Culture

The Camberwell Sunday Market has been operated by the Rotary Club of Balwyn since 1976 and comprises 370 stallholders, selling secondhand clothing, books, furniture, and crafts.

Ten churches were established in the area; Camberwell South Anglican Church, St Dunstan's Anglican, St John's Anglican, St Mark's Anglican, Our Lady of Victories Basilica, St Dominic's Catholic Church Salvation Army, Methodist (now Uniting), Presbyterian, Greek Orthodox, Church of Christ and Baptist. Camberwell Baptist Church was constituted in 1891 and has met on the same site in Riversdale Road, Hawthorn East, near Camberwell Junction, since its inception.

Sport
Camberwell Football Club participated in the Victorian Football Association from 1926 to 1991. The suburb has a junior Australian rules football team called the Camberwell Sharks, who compete in the Yarra Junior Football League.

Since October 1996 the Camberwell Magpies Cricket Club has played in the Victorian Premier Cricket competition.

See also
 City of Camberwell – Camberwell was previously within this former local government area.

References

External links

 Australian Places - Camberwell

Suburbs of Melbourne
Suburbs of the City of Boroondara